Judi Farr  (born c.1938/1939), also credited as Judy Farr, is an Australian former actress of theatre, film and television  best known for several situation comedy roles on Australian television. Farr has also appeared in Australian films such as December Boys.

Career 
Farr first became known for her role of Rita in the situation comedy My Name's McGooley, What's Yours? (1967–1968). She continued to play the character in that show's short-lived sequel series Rita and Wally in 1968.

Later she played a similarly high-profile regular role in a successful sitcom, portraying dizzy wife Thelma in Kingswood Country starting in 1980. She left the series in 1982, and in the script Thelma was sent off on a world cruise. She later sent word she would not be returning to her husband and Farr did not return to the series.

Aside from these roles Farr has had a long and busy career acting in dramatic roles in film and theatre, and television. She has had guest roles in drama series, television movies and miniseries. Television roles of the 1970s include guest spots on dramas including the Crawford Productions police shows, and a recurring role in soap opera Number 96 in 1974 and 1975, playing in comedy storylines. Later guest appearances include roles in A Country Practice, All Saints and CrashBurn.

Her first film role was a brief appearance in They're a Weird Mob (1966). Later films include Fatty Finn (1980), The Year My Voice Broke (1987), Flirting (1991) and Oscar and Lucinda (1997). Her film and television roles of the 2000s include Farscape: The Peacekeeper Wars (2004) TV movie, The Alice (2004) TV movie, Thunderstruck (2004), Go Big (2004) TV movie, Walking on Water (2002) and Changi (2001) (miniseries). She toured nationally and internationally with Cloudstreet and has worked for all major theatre companies in productions which include Death of a Salesman, Lettice and Lovage (opposite June Salter) and Angels in America. She was awarded the 1992 Theatre Critics Award for Women of Troy as well as the winner of the 2002 AFI Best Supporting Actress for  Walking on Water she is soon to be seen in the documentary film Unfolding Florence.

She is also known for portraying the role of aunt Peg in the first season of Please Like Me.
 
Farr retired from the industry in 2015, after a cancer battle.

Farr was appointed a Member of the Order of Australia for "significant service to the performing arts as an actor" in the 2021 Queen's Birthday Honours.

Filmography

FILM

TELEVISION

References

External links

Australian film actresses
Australian stage actresses
Australian television actresses
Living people
1936 births
Members of the Order of Australia
People from Cairns
Best Supporting Actress AACTA Award winners